Filić may refer to:

 Filić, a village in Vojvodina, Serbia
 Filić, a town in the province of Campobasso in the Molise region of Italy